New World First Bus Services Limited (NWFB) is the third-largest bus operator in Hong Kong. Established by NWS Holdings and FirstGroup in September 1998, it took over 88 China Motor Bus services in Hong Kong Island. Since 2020 it has been a subsidiary of Bravo Transport which also owns Citybus. The NWFB brand will be retired on 30 June 2023 with operations merged into Citybus.

History
Before NWFB was established, franchised bus service in Hong Kong Island was provided by China Motor Bus (CMB) (franchisee since 1933) and Citybus (franchisee since 1991). In the early 1990s, the service levels of CMB were in decline. Therefore, the Government of Hong Kong started to introduce new competitors by transferring the franchise of CMB routes to other companies. As a result, Citybus became the second franchisee of the bus service on Hong Kong Island. Over 40 routes were transferred between 1991 and 1995.

In spite of the loss of many profitable routes, the service of CMB did not show any significant improvement. In February 1998, the government announced the franchise for all 140 routes operated by CMB would not be reviewed when it expired 31 August that year. Eighty-eight of the routes were placed to open tender, 12 routes were transferred directly to Citybus, one cross-harbour route to Kowloon Motor Bus, and the remaining routes were cancelled.

Six companies lodged bids:
 Affluent Dragon Island Limited
 China Motor Bus (50%)
 Stagecoach Group (50%)
 Argos Bus
 Argos Enterprise (Holdings) (50%)
 HKR International (50%)
 Hong Kong Public Bus Co Limited
 Dah Chong Hong(70%)
 Kwoon Chung Bus Holdings (30%)
 Hong Kong United Bus Limited
 Citybus Group (35%)
 Cheung Kong Infrastructure Holdings (35%)
 China Travel International Investment Hong Kong (25%)
 CNT Group (5%)
 Kowloon Motor Bus Holdings
 New World First Bus
 NWS Holdings (74%)
 FirstGroup (26%)

New World First Holdings was considered a dark horse as it was the only bidder with no local bus operation experience. However, New World First Holdings was awarded a five-year franchise in March 1998 with commitments of new facilities, improved service standards and employment of CMB staff. During the handover in mid-1998, NWFB faced a lot of difficulties since CMB was reluctant to cooperate. NWFB commenced operating at midnight on 1 September 1998 after a series of negotiations and with help from the government. However NWFB had already started its operation of other non-overnight routes at midnight as CMB refused to operate after that time.

NWFB commenced operations with around 50 new buses and 710 former CMB buses, with the NWFB logo applied over the CMB logos and blue patches over the CMB corporate flag. Having purchased large numbers of second-hand buses from CMB, NWFB started an extensive program to refurbish them. The floor, handrails, lighting system and seating layout were all upgraded. The seating layout was changed from 3+2 to 2+2, making a typical refurbished bus accommodate 10 fewer passengers than one before refurbishment. Most of the non-air-conditioned buses from CMB were withdrawn prematurely in favour of more new buses.

In May 2000 FirstGroup sold its shares to joint venture partner New World Development giving it 100% ownership.

In June 2003 fellow franchised bus operator Citybus was purchased by NWFB parent company NWS Holdings, bringing the bus services of Hong Kong Island once again under control of a single organisation. Before the acquisition, many of the two companies' competing routes overlap each other. In order to make better use of company resources, many routes were reshuffled. Redundant routes were cancelled, and Octopus card bus-bus interchange discounts were introduced between routes of both companies.

In January 2004 NWFB took a 51% shareholding in Kunming New World First Bus, a joint venture established with the Kunming government to operate services to Kunming in Yunnan on 39 routes with 700 buses. 

In August 2020, along with Citybus, NWFB was sold to the Bravo Transport consortium, made up of private equity firm Templewater Bravo, Hong Kong-listed investment holding company Hans Energy and Ascendal Group.

In July 2022, Bravo Transport announced that it would be retiring the NWFB brand, with operations to be merged into Citybus when the next franchise commences on 1 July 2023.

Fleet
As at July 2022, the fleet consisted of 650 buses. NWFB operates four depots at Heng Fa Chuen, Wong Chuk Hang, Tseung Kwan O and West Kowloon.

Routes

When the government decided to terminate CMB's franchise, New World First Bus acquired 88 routes. Other routes were handed over to Citybus and Kowloon Motor Bus. New World First Bus also operates bus routes in the New Kowloon Development Area and Tseung Kwan O. On the bus stop signs, different types of routes are distinguished by different colours. As at November 2013 NWFB operates 51 routes. As it is also the second bus operator to be fully air-conditioned fleet in Hong Kong, triple digit routes beginning with 5 do not have significant meaning. In October 2009, NWFB commenced operating through its Rickshaw Sightseeing Bus subsidiary.

See also
 List of bus routes in Hong Kong
 List of Hong Kong companies
 New World Development
 Rickshaw Sightseeing Bus
 Transportation in Hong Kong

References

External links

 New World First Bus and Citybus Company website
 Bus Fan World
 New World First Bus Enviro500 12m Euro V Information

Bus companies of Hong Kong
FirstGroup companies
NWS Holdings
Transport companies established in 1998
Transport companies disestablished in 2023
1998 establishments in Hong Kong
2023 disestablishments in Hong Kong